A health deity is a god or goddess in mythology or religion associated with health, healing and wellbeing.  They may also be related to childbirth or Mother Goddesses.  They are a common feature of polytheistic religions.

List of health deities

African
 Jengu, water spirits that bring good fortune and cure disease
 Waaq/Waaqa, sky god that was worshipped by the Somali and Oromo people before Islam and Christianity
 !Xu, sky god of the Bushmen of southern Africa who is invoked in illness
 Sonzwaphi, deity of healing, Zulu mythology

Yoruba and Afro-American
 Aja, spirit of the forest, the animals within it and herbal healers
 Babalú-Ayé, spirit of illness and disease
 Erinlẹ, spirit of abundance, the healer, and Physician to the Orisha
 Loco, patron of healers and plants
 Mami Wata, a pantheon of water deities associated with healing and fertility
 Ọsanyìn, spirit of herbalism
 Sopona, god of smallpox

Armenian
 Anahit, goddess of fertility and healing, wisdom and water in Armenian mythology.

Aztec
 Ixtlilton, god of medicine.
 Patecatl, god of Pulque and healing.

Baltic
 Aušrinė, Baltic pagan deity of medicine, health and beauty.
 Ragana, witch deity protecting healers and wisdom holders.

Celtic
 Airmed, Irish goddess associated with healing and resurrection.
 Alaunus, Gaulish god of the sun, healing and prophecy associated with Greek god Helios-Apollo
 Atepomarus, Gaulish healing god associated with the Greek god Apollo
 Borvo, Celto-Lusitanian healing god associated with bubbling spring water
 Brigid, Irish goddess associated with healing
 Dian Cecht, Irish god of healing
 Glanis, Gaulish god associated with a healing spring at the town of Glanum
 Grannus, Gaulish god associated with  spas, thermal springs and the sun, regularly identified with Apollo
 Hooded Spirits, hooded deities associated with health and fertility
 Ianuaria, goddess associated with healing
 Iovantucarus, Gaulish healer-god and protector of youth associated with Lenus Mars
 Lenus, Gaulish healing god associated with the Greek god Ares
Lugh, god of arts, crafts, healing and the Sun. He is associated with Greek gods Hermes and Apollo.
 Maponos, god of youth, associated with the Greek god Apollo
 Mullo, Gaulish deity associated with the Greek god Ares and said to heal afflictions of the eye
 Nodens, a Roman British god associated with healing, the sea, hunting and dogs
 Sirona, Gallo-Roman and Celto-Germanic goddess associated with healing

Chinese
 Bao Sheng Da Di, the God of Medicine in Chinese folk religion and Taoism
 Shennong Da Di, one of the Three Sovereigns, also known as the Divine Farmer who acquired and spread knowledge of herbs and medicine
 Hua Tuo (華佗), regarded as "divine physician" in Chinese history and worshipped as a Medicinal Deity
 Taiyi Zhushen, God of Qi
 Taokang Geyan, God of Essence
 Zhang Guolao, one of the Eight Immortals, whose wine was considered to have healing properties
 He Xiangu, one of the Eight Immortals, whose lotus flower improves one's mental and physical health
 Li Tieguai, one of the Eight Immortals, who alleviates the suffering of the poor, sick and needy with special medicine from his gourd
 Wong Tai Sin, a deified Taoist hermit during the Eastern Jin dynasty, known to have the power of healing
 Jiutian Xuannü, goddess of war, sex, and longevity (long life), who is connected to calisthenics, diet, alchemy, neidan (inner alchemy), and physiology

Egyptian
 Sekhmet, goddess of healing and medicine of Upper Egypt
 Heka, deification of magic, through which Egyptians believed they could gain protection, healing and support
 Serket, goddess of healing stings and bites
 Ta-Bitjet, a scorpion goddess whose blood is a panacea for all poisons
Isis, goddess of healing, magic, marriage and perfection

Etruscan
 Fufluns, god of plant life, happiness and health and growth in all things
 Menrva, goddess of war, art, wisdom and healthcare

Filipino

Kadaklan: the Itneg deity who is second in rank; taught the people how to pray, harvest their crops, ward off evil spirits, and overcome bad omens and cure sicknesses
Talanganay: a male Gaddang god-spirit; enters the body of a healer and gives instructions on how to heal the sick while in a trance
Menalam: a female Gaddang goddess-spirit; enters the body of a healer and gives instructions on how to heal the sick while in a trance
Cabuyaran: the Ilocano goddess of healing; daughter of Abra and Makiling, the elder; she eloped with Anianihan
Akasi: the Sambal god of health and sickness; sometimes seen at the same level of power as Malayari
Lakambini: the Tagalog deity who protects throats and who is invoked to cure throat aches; also called Lakandaytan, as the god of attachment
Daniw: the Hanunoo Mangyan spirit residing in the stone cared for by the healers
Hamorawan Lady: the deity of the Hamorawan spring in Borongan, who blesses the waters with healing properties
Beljan: the Pala'wan spirits of all beljan (shamans); able to travel to the vertical universe, divided into fourteen different layers, in order to heal the world and to re-establish cosmic balance; also referred to as Balyan
Maguimba: the Batak god in the remotest times, lived among the people, having been summoned by a powerful babaylan (shaman); provided all the necessities of life, as well as all cures for illnesses; has the power to bring the dead back to life
Ibabasag: the Bukidnon goddess of pregnant women
Mandarangan: the Bagobo god of warriors married to Darago; resides at Mount Apo's summit; human sacrifices to him are rewarded with health, valor in war, and success in the pursuit of wealth
Cotabato Healer Monkey: a Maguindanao monkey who lived near a pond outside Cotabato city; it heals those who touch it and those who give it enough offerings
Pagari: also called Inikadowa, the Maguindanao twin-spirit who is sometimes in the form of a crocodile; if a person is possessed by them, the person will attain the gift of healing

Greek

 Apollo, god of medicine, healing and plagues, and prosperity healing
 Asclepius, god of the medicinal arts
 Artemis, goddess of young women and childbirth
 Chiron, a centaur known for his knowledge and skill in medicinal arts
 Darrhon, a health god worshipped in Macedon
 Eileithyia, goddess of childbirth  
 Epione, goddess of the soothing of pain
 Aceso, goddess of curing sickness and healing wounds
 Aegle, goddess of radiant good health
 Hera, goddess of childbirth; she was called upon for women's safety during childbirth and for good health of the infants
 Hygieia, goddess of cleanliness and sanitation
 Iaso, goddess of cures and remedies
 Paean, physician of the gods, who was later syncretized with Apollo
 Panacea, goddess of the cure by medicines and salves
 Telesphorus, demi-god of convalescence

Hindu
Vaidyanatha - Shiva as healer of all

 Ashvins, twin doctors of the gods and gods of Ayurvedic medicine
 Dhanvantari, physician of the gods and god of Ayurvedic medicine
 Dharti, or Earth is considered the goddess of nature and well being of living creatures
 Mariamman, goddess of rain, medicine, and plagues
 Shitala Devi, goddess of smallpox and disease
 Jvarasura, Demon of fever
 Paranasabari, diseases
 Bhramari Devi, - Goddess of Epidemics 
 Jaya Durga, - Goddess of aarogya or healing

Hittite
 Kamrusepa, goddess of healing, medicine, and magic

Hurrian
 Shaushka, goddess of love, war, and healing

Inuit
 Eeyeekalduk, god of medicine and good health
 Pinga, goddess of the hunt, fertility and medicine

Japanese
 Ashitekōjin, god of hands and feet
 Sukunahikona, god of medicine, as well as nation building, incantation, agriculture and hot springs

Maya
 Ixchel, jaguar goddess of midwifery and medicine
 Maximón, hero god of health

Mesopotamian
 Namtar, god of death and disease
 Ninazu, god of the underworld and healing
 Ningishzida, god of the underworld and patron of medicine
 Ninti, Sumerian goddess of healing
 Ninisina, divine physician, worshiped in Isin
 Ninkarrak, divine physician, worshiped in Sippar and Terqa
 Nintinugga, divine physician, worshiped in Nippur
 Damu, son and assistant of Ninisina

Native American
 Kumugwe, Nuxalk underwater god with the power to see into the future, heal the sick and injured, and bestow powers on those whom he favors
 Angak, a Hopi kachina spirit,  represents a healing and protective male figure.

Norse
 Eir, goddess associated with medical skill

Ossetian 

 Alardy, god who heals skin diseases

Persian
 Haoma, god of health

Phoenician
 Eshmun, god of healing

Roman
 Angitia, snake goddess associated with magic and healing
 Apollo, Greco-Roman god of light, music, healing, and the sun
 Bona Dea, goddess of fertility, healing, virginity, and women
 Cardea, goddess of health, thresholds and door hinges and handles
 Carna, goddess who presided over the heart and other organs
 Endovelicus, god of public health and safety
 Febris, goddess who embodied and protected people from fever and malaria
 Feronia, goddess of wildlife, fertility, health, and abundance
 Valetudo, Roman name for the Greek goddess Hygieia, goddess of health, cleanliness, and hygiene
 Vejovis, god of healing
 Verminus, god who protected cattle from disease

Sami
 Beiwe, goddess of the sun, spring, fertility and sanity, who restored the mental health of those driven mad by the darkness of the winter

Slavic
 Żywie, goddess of health and healing

Thracian
 Derzelas, god of abundance and the underworld, health and human spirit's vitality

Turkic
Akbugha, god of medicine. He is the god of health and healing in ancient Turkic tradition. He has a white serpent.

In monotheistic religion

Christianity and Islam
According to the Gospels, Jesus performed miracles during his earthly life as he traveled through Galilee, Judea, and Jerusalem. The miracles performed by Jesus are mentioned in two sections of the Qur'an (Sura 3:49 and 5: 110) in general, with few details or comments. One of the greatest miracles Jesus performed was healing (Blind, Leprous, Paralytic, Epileptic, Healing a Bleeding Woman, etc.), the Gospels provide different amounts of detail for each episode, at other times he uses materials such as spit and mud. In general, they are mentioned in the Synoptic Gospels, but not in the Gospel of John. Luke, one of the apostles, was a physician (Greek for "one who heals").

Jesus endorsed the use of the medical assistance of the time (medicines of oil and wine) when he told the parable of the Good Samaritan (Luke 10:25–37), who "bound up [an injured man's] wounds, pouring on oil and wine" (verse 34) as a physician would. Jesus then told the doubting teacher of the law (who had elicited this parable by his self-justifying question, "And who is my neighbor?" in verse 29) to "go, and do likewise" in loving others with whom he would never ordinarily associate (verse 37).

In 1936, Ludwig Bieler argued that Jesus was stylized in the New Testament in the image of the "divine man" (Greek: theios aner), which was widespread in antiquity. It is said that many of the famous rulers and elders of the time had divine healing powers.

References

Health deities
Deities